Genoplesium firthii, commonly known as Firth's midge orchid, is a species of small terrestrial orchid endemic to Tasmania. It has a single thin leaf fused to the flowering stem and up to six small, yellowish green or reddish flowers with a red labellum. It grows in coastal heath and scrub and is currently known only from a single population of about twelve plants near Coles Bay.

Description
As with others in the genus, the flowers are inverted so that the labellum is above the column rather than below it. They also have a small gland on the tip. There is a callus in the centre of the labellum and extending nearly to its tip. Flowering occurs from January to March.

Taxonomy and naming
Firth's midge orchid was first formally described in 1971 by Leonard Cady who gave it the name Prasophyllum firthii from a specimen collected near Bicheno. The description was published in The Orchadian. In 1989, David Jones changed the name to Genoplesium firthii and in 2005 changed the name again to Corunastylis firthii but the last change is not accepted by the Australian Plant Census.

Distribution and habitat
Genoplesium firthii grows on a roadside near Coles Bay.

Conservation
Firth's midge orchid is only known from a single population containing about twelve plants. It was formerly also known to occur at Friendly Beaches Reserve but has not been seen there since 1973. The species is classified as Endangered under the Tasmanian Threatened Species Protection Act 1995 and as Critically Endangered under the Commonwealth Government Environment Protection and Biodiversity Conservation Act 1999 (EPBC) Act. The main threats to the species are road maintenance, trampling by people and cars, by weed invasion and inappropriate fire regimes.

References

firthii
Orchids of Tasmania
Plants described in 1971